John Givan Davis (October 10, 1810 – January 18, 1866) was an American farmer and politician who served four terms as a U.S. Representative from Indiana in the mid-19th Century.

Early life
Born near Flemingsburg, Kentucky, Davis moved to Indiana with his parents, who settled in Rockville, Parke County, in 1819. He attended the country schools and engaged in agricultural pursuits. He served as Sheriff of Parke County from 1830 to 1833, and clerk of the county court 1833–1850.

Political career
Davis was elected as a Democrat to the 32nd and 33rd Congresses but was unsuccessful for re-election in 1854 to the 34th Congress. He was elected as a Democrat to the 35th Congress and re-elected as an Anti-Lecompton Democrat to the 36th Congress, he was not a candidate for renomination in 1860 to the Thirty-seventh Congress.

Later life
Following his political career Davis engaged in mercantile pursuits and meat packing in Montezuma, Indiana, and moved to Terre Haute, Indiana, and engaged in business as a dry-goods merchant.

Death
He died in Terre Haute, Indiana, on January 18, 1866, and was interred in Highland Lawn Cemetery.

External links

1810 births
1866 deaths
People from Flemingsburg, Kentucky
Politicians from Terre Haute, Indiana
Democratic Party members of the United States House of Representatives from Indiana
19th-century American politicians
19th-century American businesspeople